Henry William Worley (April 9, 1877 – August 5, 1938) was the 41st mayor of Columbus, Ohio and the 37th person to serve in that office.   He was elected in 1931 and served Columbus during the rise of the New Deal programs during the presidency of Franklin Delano Roosevelt.  After one term in office he was defeated in the 1935 mayoral election by Myron B. Gessaman.

References

Bibliography

Further reading

External links
Henry W. Worley at Political Graveyard

Mayors of Columbus, Ohio
1877 births
1938 deaths
Politicians from London
English emigrants to the United States
Ohio Democrats